The Teacup galaxy, also known as the Teacup AGN or SDSS J1430+1339 is a low redshift type 2 quasar, showing an extended loop of ionized gas resembling a handle of a teacup, which was discovered by volunteers of the Galaxy Zoo project and labeled as a Voorwerpje.

Galaxy 
The Teacup galaxy is dominated by a bulge and has an asymmetric structure with a shell-like structure and a tidal tail. The shell and tail are signatures of a recent merger of two galaxies. Dust lanes in the system are interpreted as a gas-rich merger. Several candidate star clusters were identified in this galaxy with Hubble Space Telescope images. Observations with the Gran Telescopio Canarias showed that the Teacup Galaxy has a giant reservoir of ionized gas extending up to 111 kpc. The optical/radio bubbles seem to be expanding across this intergalactic medium.

Active galactic nucleus 
Early studies of the Teacup AGN suggested that it is fading, although there was no clear evidence. Observations with VLT/SINFONI showed a blueshifted nuclear outflow with a velocity of 1600–1800 km/s. Observations in x-rays with Swift, XMM-Newton and Chandra revealed a powerful, highly obscured active galactic nucleus. This new result suggests that the AGN might not require fading. The quasar has dimmed by only a factor of 25 or less over the past 100,000 years.

Bubbles 

One bubble was discovered by Galaxy Zoo volunteers in SDSS images as a 5 kpc loop of ionized gas. The loop is dominated by emission lines, such as hydrogen alpha and doubly ionized oxygen, which gives the loop seen in SDSS images a purple color. The emission of [O II] is extremely strong in the Teacup AGN and the quasar 3C 48 shows a similar [O II]/Hβ ratio.

Follow-up observations with the Very Large Array showed two 10-12 kpc bubbles, one "eastern bubble", consistent with the loop in optical observations and a "western bubble", only visible in radio wavelengths. The study also found a bright emission towards the north-east of the AGN, which is consistent with high-velocity ionized gas (-740 km/s). The bubbles are either created by small-scale radio jets or by quasar winds.

Observations with Chandra revealed a loop in x-ray emission, consistent with the "eastern bubble". The Chandra data also show evidence for hotter gas within the bubble, which may imply that a wind of material is blowing away from the black hole. Such a wind, which was driven by radiation from the quasar, may have created the bubbles found in the Teacup.

See also
IC 2497
Hanny's Voorwerp
Galaxy Zoo
Zooniverse
List of quasars

References

External links
Hubble spies the Teacup, and I spy Hubble blog post from the Galaxy Zoo website
Voorwerpjes in Space NASA Astronomy Picture of the Day
VLA Finds Unexpected Storm at Galaxy's Core press-release by NRAO
SDSS J1430+1339: Storm Rages in Cosmic Teacup photo album by the website of Chandra

1436754
F14281+1352
Quasars
Boötes